Mansoa alliacea, or garlic vine, is a species of tropical liana in the family Bignoniaceae. It is native to Northern South America, and has spread to Central America and Brazil. Among the mestizos of the Amazon rainforest it is known as ajo sacha, a Spanish-Quechua name that means "forest garlic" or "wild garlic".

Mansoa alliacea has been exported overseas, and grows in the favourable climates of (for example) Puerto Rico, Southern Africa, Thailand and India. It is cultivated in the West Indies.

Gallery

References

Flora of northern South America
Flora of Puerto Rico
alliacea
Flora without expected TNC conservation status